Thomas Leo McInerney (24 April 1898 – 29 December 1963) was an Australian rules footballer who played for Essendon in the Victorian Football League (VFL).

McInerney was one of six Essendon players to debut against Richmond in the opening round of the 1918 VFL season and kicked the only two goals of his VFL career.

During the 1920s, he played in the VFA at Brunswick and was an important member of their 1925 premiership success with 79 goals for the year. That was enough to top the league's goal-kicking, as was his tally of 84 goals in 1929.

References

External links

Leo McInerney's playing statistics from The VFA Project

1898 births
Essendon Football Club players
Brunswick Football Club players
Australian rules footballers from Melbourne
1963 deaths
People from Carlton, Victoria